Halmaj is a village in Borsod-Abaúj-Zemplén county, Hungary.
Before World War II, there was a Jewish community in Halmaj. At its height, there were 61 Jews in the community  most of them were murdered by the Nazis in the Holocaust.

References

External links 
 Street map 

Populated places in Borsod-Abaúj-Zemplén County